Ice 2 is a 2020 Russian musical romantic drama sports film directed by Zhora Kryzhovnikov, the film takes place after the events told in the original film. The film stars Aglaya Tarasova, Alexander Petrov and Mariya Aronova in the lead roles were joined by Nadezhda Mikhalkova and Yulia Khlynina.

Ice 2 was theatrically released in Russia on Valentine's Day, February 14, 2020.

The film is a sequel to the film Ice (2018) and, like its predecessor, became a blockbuster. It grossed 193.7 million rubles on opening day, making it the highest-grossing Russian film on opening day. In total, the film has grossed over 1.4 billion rubles.

Plot 
Figure skater Nadya Lapshina and hockey player Sasha Gorin got married, and more than anything else they wish to have a child. True, the price they will have to pay for this will be unimaginably high. After such upheavals, it seems impossible to count on a happy ending.

Cast 
 Aglaya Tarasova as Nadezhda 'Nadya' Lapshina
 Alexander Petrov as Alexander 'Sasha' Gorin
 Mariya Aronova as Irina Shatalina, figure skating coach
 Vitaliya Korniyenko as Nadezhda 'Nadya' Gorina, Nadya and Sasha's daughter
 Nadezhda Mikhalkova as Anna 'Anya', employee of the department of guardianship
 Yulia Khlynina as Margarita 'Rita', sports director of the hockey club «Baykprommash»
  as Sergey Ivanovich, coach of the hockey team
 Pavel Ustinov as skate rental employee
 Sergey Kuznetsov as security guard

Production 
Zhora Kryzhovnikov will occupy the directorial chair of the film Ice 2 - the sequel to the 2018 sports tape. 
The script for the tape was again written by Andrey Zolotarev, who worked on the first film, wrote the script for the sequel.

Filming 
Principal photography began on March 23, 2019, in Lake Baikal, the Republic of Buryatia, Irkutsk Oblast, continue in Moscow. The slogan of the film is Putter on Ice.

Music 
The film contains several covers of famous russian songs :
 Poplar Fuzz (Тополиный пух) - Ivanushki International.
 Wonderful Far-away (Прекрасное далёко) - theme song of the television miniseries Guest from the Future.
 Not Gonna Get Us (Нас не догонят) - t.A.T.u.
 Lake of Hope (Озеро надежды) - Alla Pugacheva.
 Spins (Кружит) - Monatik.
 Saṃsāra (Сансара) - Basta.

Release 
Ice 2 is scheduled for release in the Russian Federation on February 14, 2020 by Sony Pictures Productions and Releasing (SPPR). Premiered on March 6, 2020 in the United States and Canada.

Reception

Box office
On the first day of rental, the film collected 189.348 million rubles. This is the most successful start of a domestic film at the box office.
According to the results of the first weekend, Ice 2 grossed over 577.3 million rubles, and thus led the Russian hire.
At the second weekend, the film again became the leader: as of February 24, 2020, the film collected more than 1 billion rubles, becoming the 14th Russian film to overcome this line of box office. 
As of March 12, 2020, the sequel has collected 1.511 billion rubles, thereby he managed to block the success of the first part.

Accolades

References

External links 
 Official website at the Art Pictures Studio
 

2010s musical drama films
2010s romantic musical films
2010s sports drama films
2018 romantic drama films
2020 films
2020s legal drama films
Columbia Pictures films
Courtroom films
Figure skating films
Films about children
Films about women's sports
Films produced by Fyodor Bondarchuk
Films set in Russia
Films set in Siberia
Russian ice hockey films
Russian musical drama films
Russian pregnancy films
Russian romantic drama films
Russian sequel films
Russian sports drama films
2010s Russian-language films
Teen sports films